CoRoT-16 is a solitary star located in the equatorial constellation Scutum. With an apparent magnitude of 16, it requires a powerful telescope to be seen, and is located 2,400 light years away based on parallax.

Properties
This is an ordinary G-type main sequence star with a similar mass to the Sun, but is 19% larger than the latter. It radiates at 77% the Sun's luminosity from its photosphere at an effective temperature of  5,650 K, which gives it the yellow-hue of a G-type star. CoRoT-16 has a rotation rate of 1/2 km/s, which correlates with an age of 6.7 billion years. As expected with planetary hosts, CoRoT-16 has a high metallicity.

Planetary system
In 2011, the CoRoT mission discovered an unusually eccentric "hot Jupiter".

References

G-type main-sequence stars
Scutum (constellation)
Planetary systems with one confirmed planet
CoRoT